Julius Lippert (9 July 1895 – 30 June 1956) was a German politician in the Nazi Party.

Early life and World War I 
Born in Basel, Switzerland, he became an extreme anti-Semite in his youth after reading the anti-Semitic philosophers Joseph Arthur Comte de Gobineau and Houston Stewart Chamberlain. He joined the German military and fought in World War I, twice being wounded, and ended the war as a 2nd Lieutenant.

Nazi career 
In 1922, Lippert participated in the assassination of Foreign Minister Walther Rathenau, and he eventually joined the NSDAP (Nazi Party). He became prominent in the NSDAP due to his rabid anti-Semitism and connection with Joseph Goebbels. In 1933, he was appointed the Reichskommissar of Berlin, purged the capital's government of opposition and was responsible for much of the early persecution of Jews in Berlin. He was also the head of propaganda in southeastern Germany. He was formally appointed as mayor (city president) of Berlin on 5 January 1937, though he had been the city's de facto ruler for seven years.

In 1936, Lippert supervised the Olympics and tried to make a good impression on the tourists. However, his power struggles with more powerful politicians would lead to his downfall. By 1937, Goebbels came to detest Lippert for his behavior. Finally, in 1940, Lippert argued with Adolf Hitler and Albert Speer over the re-organization of Berlin, which lead to his dismissal. According to Speer, Hitler, who had become increasingly hostile to him, 
reportedly expressed his frustrations by suggesting, “Lippert is an incompetent, an idiot, a failure, a zero.” 

His departure from the prominent position led to rumors that Lippert had been executed. He instead joined the Wehrmacht and was transferred to Belgium where he was the commandant of Arlon during March 1943 - August 1944. Lippert's primary role in the war, however, was organizing radio propaganda in Belgrade.

Post-war 
After the war, he was extradited to Belgium in January 1946 for trial. He was sentenced to six years of hard labor on 29 June 1951, for involvement in war crimes. Although the sentence was increased to eight years in early 1952, he was released on 15 April 1952 since he received credit for time served. He was subsequently classified as a Nazi activist by a de-Nazification court. He lectured at universities until his death on 30 June 1956, in Bad Schwalbach.

References

External links
 

1895 births
1956 deaths
Politicians from Basel-Stadt
German National People's Party politicians
German Völkisch Freedom Party politicians
Nazi Party politicians
Nazi Party officials
Mayors of Berlin
German Army personnel of World War I
German Army officers of World War II
Holocaust perpetrators in Belgium
Holocaust perpetrators in Germany
People extradited from Germany
People extradited to Belgium
German people convicted of war crimes
Swiss emigrants to Germany
German newspaper editors
Nazi propagandists
Humboldt University of Berlin alumni